Anthony Rudel Graboski (May 29, 1916 – September 18, 2000) was a Canadian professional ice hockey defenceman who played 66 games in the National Hockey League for the Montreal Canadiens. He was born in Timmins, Ontario, but grew up in Oshawa, Ontario.

External links

1916 births
2000 deaths
Canadian ice hockey defencemen
Ice hockey people from Ontario
Montreal Canadiens players
Sportspeople from Oshawa
Sportspeople from Timmins